S99 may refer to:
 Avia S-99, a Czechoslovak fighter aircraft
 , formerly SAS Joanna van der Merwe, a submarine of the South African Navy
 Sintura S99, a racing car
 , a submarine of the Soviet Navy
 S99, a refugee in Nauru
 S99, a line of the Lucerne S-Bahn